Hamoukar is a large archaeological site located in the Jazira region of northeastern Syria (Al Hasakah Governorate), near the Iraqi and Turkish borders. The early settlement dates back to the 5th millennium BCE, and it existed simultaneously with the Ubaid and the early Uruk cultures. It was a big centre of obsidian production. In the 3rd millennium, this was one of the largest cities of Northern Mesopotamia, and extended to 105 ha.

History
The origins of urban settlements has generally been attributed to the riverine societies of southern Mesopotamia (in what is now southern Iraq). This is the area of ancient Sumer, where around 4000 BC the Mesopotamian cities such of Ur and Uruk emerged. In 2007, following the discoveries at Hamoukar, some archaeologists have argued that the Cradle of Civilization could have extended further up the Tigris River and included the part of northern Syria where Hamoukar is located.

In the Late Chalcolithic 2 period (5th millennium BC) the site sustained a seasonal or dispersed occupation covering about 280 hectares. As an urban center Tell Hamoulkar was first occupied in the early 4th millennium BC and experienced major growth in the middle of the 3rd millennium BC through the Uruk period. Occupation, at a lesser scale, continued through the Ninevite 5 period in the first half of the 2nd millennium and thereafter and the site was abandoned at the end of that millennium.

Other contemporary early sites in this area are Chagar Bazar, Tell Arbid, and the multi-period site of Tell Brak.

Archaeology
The site has a 15 hectare high mound (peaking at 18 meters above the plain and first settled in the early 4th millennium BC) and a 5 meter high lower town on three side which was occupied beginning in the middle 3rd millennium BC and brought the site up to its maximum of 98 hectares. There are three named sub-mounds in the site, Tell al-Sara, Tell al-Duwaym, and Tell al-Tamr, with Tell Mas’ada lying just outside the site boundary. The southern extension of the mound is also known as Khirbet al-Fakhar. Arcaheology dates this area to the middle 5th millennium BC though radiocarbon dates point to the late 5th millennium BC. About 40 hectares of the site is covered by the modern village of al-Hurriya including paved roads and mudbrick homes.

The site was first examined and described by Van Liere and Lauffray in the 1950s noting a two stepped plateau with a ditch 100 meters from the foot of the mound.  A scaled plan, based on aerial photographs, was published in 1963 which estimated the mound area at 116 hectares and the area within the circular depression as 216 hectares. Due to this large size Van Liere proposed it as the location of Washshukanni. Excavation by a joint Syrian-American expedition (by the Oriental Institute of the University of Chicago and the Syrian Directorate General of Antiquities) was conducted beginning in 1999 and ending in 2010. Initial work in 1999 included an intensive surface survey based on 10 meter by 10 meter squares. The excavation was initially led by McGuire Gibson and later by Clemens D. Reichel.

 The site was abandoned at the end of the 3rd millennium BC. During the 2001 excavations a 400 square meter trench opened in the residential area of the lower town found that it was prosperous and had been sacked and abandoned at that time.

Thousands of clay sealings have been found on the site, indicating the existence of a complex bureaucratic system. These sealings were once used to protect doors or containers from tampering and were impressed with stamp seals. Artifacts from Hamoukar can be seen at the Oriental Institute. Eye Idols made of alabaster or bone have been found in Tell Hamoukar. Similar Eye Idols from the same period have also been found in Tell Brak, the biggest settlement from Syria's Late Chalcolithic period.

Obsidian
Obsidian fragments were found across a 280 hectare area with obsidian workshops located in a section of the lower town, indicating the existence of the obsidian production facilities of both weapons and tools. They were in use at least as early as several centuries before the destruction of the 3rd millennium BC city in c. 3500 BC.  The volcanic rock of this type does not occur in Hamoukar area, so it must have been imported. The nearest deposits are located in the area of Mount Nemrut (today's Turkey), about 170 km north of the city. This is confirmed by chemical analysis of the obsidian.

The findings were a surprise for many archaeologists, since they indicate the existence of independent trading networks in the northern Mesopotamia outside of the influence of southern cities, such as Ur and Uruk.

Earliest urban warfare
Excavation work undertaken in 2005 and 2006 showed that Hamoulkar was destroyed around 3500 BC. This may be the evidence of the earliest urban warfare attested so far in the archaeological record of the Near East. Slings and thousands of clay bullets have been found, indicating a siege, along with widespread signs of destruction. The force responsible for the destruction is uncertain though the city may have fallen victim to the Uruk expansion from the south as the next occupation layer is of the Uruk civilization. Contained excavations in 2008 and 2010 tried to expand on that.

See also 
Cities of the Ancient Near East

Notes

Further reading
Baldi, Johnny Samuele, and Khaled Abu Jayyab, "A comparison of the ceramic assemblages from Tell Feres al-Sharqi and Hamoukar", Publications de l'Institut Français d'Études Anatoliennes 27.1, pp. 163-180, 2012
Reichel, Clemens., "Administrative complexity in Syria during the 4th millennium BC: The seals and sealings from Tell Hamoukar.", Akkadica 123.1, pp. 35-56, 2002
M. Gibson, et al., Hamoukar: A summary of Three Seasons of Excavation, Akkadica, vol. 123 (fasc. 1), pp. 11–34, 2002
 Jason A. Ur, Tell Hamoukar, Volume 1. Urbanism and Cultural Landscapes in Northeastern Syria: The Tell Hamoukar Survey, 1999–2001., Oriental Institute Publication 137, Oriental Institute, 2011,  (Associated Maps 1  2  3 )
T. J. Wilkinson, Physical and cultural landscapes of the Hamoukar area, (Syria), Akkadica, vol. 123 (fasc. 1), pp. 89–105, 2002

External links
 Hamoukar Project Homepage  at the Oriental Institute of the University of Chicago 
 Video on Hamoukar Expedition  at the University of Chicago website 
 "In the Ruins: Tell Hamoukar", New York Times Science Video (January 16, 2007).
 "New details of first major urban battle emerge along with clues about civilization's origins", press release by University of Chicago News Office (January 16, 2007).
 "University of Chicago-Syrian team finds first evidence of warfare in ancient Mesopotamia", press release by University of Chicago News Office (December 16, 2005).
 "Ruins in Northern Syria Bear the Scars of a City's Final Battle" by John Wilford, New York Times (January 16, 2007)

Populated places established in the 5th millennium BC
Populated places disestablished in the 4th millennium BC
1999 archaeological discoveries
Archaeological sites in al-Hasakah Governorate
Former populated places in Syria
Uruk period
Obsidian
Ubaid period
City-states